The 1958–59 Bradford City A.F.C. season was the 46th in the club's history.

The club finished 11th in Division Three, and reached the 4th round of the FA Cup.

Sources

References

Bradford City A.F.C. seasons
Bradford City